In computer graphics, swizzling is the ability to compose vectors by arbitrarily rearranging and combining components of other vectors. For example, if A = {1,2,3,4}, where the components are x, y, z, and w respectively, you could compute B = A.wwxy, whereupon B would equal {4,4,1,2}. Additionally, combining two two-component vectors can create a four-component vector, or any combination of vectors and swizzling. This is common in GPGPU applications.

In terms of linear algebra, this is equivalent to multiplying by a matrix whose rows are standard basis vectors. If , then swizzling  as above looks like

See also
 Z-order curve

References

External links
 OpenGL Vertex Program documentation

Swizzling